José Ángel Gascón Martín (born 15 March 1985, in Almagro, Ciudad Real) is a Spanish footballer who plays for Almagro CF as a midfielder.

External links
 
 Futbolme profile  

1985 births
Living people
Sportspeople from the Province of Ciudad Real
Spanish footballers
Footballers from Castilla–La Mancha
Association football midfielders
Segunda División players
Segunda División B players
Tercera División players
Sporting de Gijón B players
Atlético Malagueño players
Málaga CF players
AD Alcorcón footballers
CA Osasuna B players
Real Jaén footballers
CD Guijuelo footballers
Ontinyent CF players